School of Experiential Education (SEE) is a small alternative high school located in Toronto's west end of Etobicoke. SEE's take on alternative education includes small class sizes, discussion-based courses, thematic English courses, and opportunities for independent and project-based learning.  SEE delivers all courses required for the completion of the Ontario Secondary School Diploma. It offers opportunities to participate in media, technology, and photography courses, with equipment such as cameras, two computer labs, recording equipment and a dark room available for student use. SEE has a full curriculum that includes the arts, math, humanities and sciences, as well as physical education, technology and business. SEE is a semestered school.

It is designed for students with strong academic potential who are disinterested by the traditional high school approaches to learning. Almost all students go on to university.

The school began in 1971 as one of two alternative schools in the Etobicoke School Board. When the government of Mike Harris merged the Toronto area school boards and sharply cut budgets in 1998, the school was threatened with closure.

Curriculum 

Because SEE has a small student population, the range of courses offered each term is limited. However, the small class sizes (usually 20 or fewer students per class) enable a greater breadth and depth within each individual course, which is not usually possible in normal class sizes of 30 or more. Because of the informal teaching environment and low student to teacher ratio, students are encouraged to learn independently, through discussions, and through projects, often of their own design.

Many courses at SEE are thematic. Past English classes have had themes of Death & Dying, Classics, Queer, Graphic Novel, and Science Fiction. A Writer's Craft course is also offered. Themed history courses have included Genocide, Power and Protest, and Revolution. A History of Food course was offered in the 2012-13 school year.

Although SEE offers the same credit as other schools, the classes generally have different names than most schools. For example, the grade 9-10 English class for 08-09 was named "Stop The Madness"; there have been grade 10 and 11 Tech courses called "Schnitzel" and "Tattoo"; and the Physical Education class is known as "Healthy Living".

Admission process 

Because SEE is an optional attendance school, potential students must go through an application process  in order to be admitted. This process includes an application (including an essay), an interview, and submission of a transcript (if the student has previously attended a secondary school) or a report card (if the student is applying directly from grade eight).

Notable alumni 

 Dave Foley, actor/comedian (The Kids in the Hall) (did not graduate)

See also
List of high schools in Ontario

References

External links
School website
TDSB site

Educational institutions established in 1971
High schools in Toronto
Education in Etobicoke
Schools in the TDSB
Alternative schools
1971 establishments in Ontario